The 2009 Lambertz Open by STAWAG was a professional tennis tournament played on indoor carpet courts. It was the nineteenth edition of the tournament which was part of the 2009 ATP Challenger Tour. It took place in Aachen, Germany between 9 and 15 November 2009.

ATP entrants

Seeds

 Rankings are as of November 2, 2009.

Other entrants
The following players received wildcards into the singles main draw:
  Dominik Schulz
  Nils Langer
  Rajeev Ram
  Sebastian Rieschick

The following players received entry from the qualifying draw:
  Rohan Bopanna
  Peter Gojowczyk
  Nikola Mektić
  Michał Przysiężny
  Louk Sorensen (LL)

Champions

Singles

 Rajeev Ram def.  Dustin Brown, 7–6(2), 6–7(5), 7–6(2)

Doubles

 Rohan Bopanna /  Aisam-ul-Haq Qureshi def.  Philipp Marx /  Igor Zelenay, 6–4, 7–6(6)

External links
Official website
ITF Search 
2009 Draws

Lambertz Open by STAWAG
Lambertz Open by STAWAG
2009 in German tennis